Mordellistena irfianorum is a beetle in the genus Mordellistena of the family Mordellidae. It was described in 1999 by Lu & Ivie.

References

irfianorum
Beetles described in 1999